ChinaSat 10 previously known as SinoSat 5 is a Chinese communications satellite. It was launched at 16:13 UTC on 20 June 2011 on a Long March 3B rocket.

The satellite is a replacement for ChinaSat 5B. It has a mass of 5,100 kg and will be positioned in geosynchronous orbit at 110.5 degrees East. It is operated by China Satellite Communications.

See also

 2011 in spaceflight

References

External links
Nasa Spaceflight.com

Communications satellites of China
Satellites of China
Spacecraft launched in 2011
2011 in China
Spacecraft launched by Long March rockets